"High Energy" is a dance/disco song by The Supremes. Released as the album's title-track single in 1976 from their penultimate album High Energy, this energic, sound-bursting tune featured lead vocals by Susaye Greene. Greene, new to the group, was brought in to dub her vocals although Scherrie Payne had already recorded lead vocals prior to Greene's entry into the trio. As such, this was the final single to feature former member Cindy Birdsong's vocals, and the sixth and final single of the group to feature four members. Written by Harold Beatty, Brian Holland and Edward Holland, Jr., the song peaked at position nine on the dance/disco charts later that same year.

Personnel
 Lead vocals by Susaye Greene
 Background vocals by Mary Wilson, Cindy Birdsong and Scherrie Payne

Chart history

References

1976 singles
1976 songs
The Supremes songs
Songs written by Brian Holland
Songs written by Eddie Holland
Song recordings produced by Brian Holland
Song recordings produced by Edward Holland Jr.
Motown singles